is a Japanese actress who is represented by the talent agency, Trustar. Her sister is Nana Hachimine.

Biography
In June 1998, Hachimine she was affiliated by Five Eight. She debuted in an advertisement for Disney's Party Hero.

In 2003, Hachimine participated in the Fuji Television variety show, Doll's Vox.

In 2010, she moved from Five Eight to Oscar Promotion.

In February 2020, she left Oscar Promotion.

On her birthday, July 19, 2020, she announced her marriage. In November 22, 2021, she gave birth to a baby boy.

Filmography

TV series

Films

References

External links
Official profile 

Japanese child actresses
1989 births
Living people
Actresses from Tokyo